Kadıncık 1 hydroelectric plant ( or shortly Kadıncık 1 HES), is a privately owned hydroelectric power station located in Mersin Province, Turkey.

Geography
The plant is in the southern slopes of the Toros Mountains and on Kadıncık River, a tributary of Berdan River. The nearest village is Meşelik.

History
The plant was put into service in 1971. In 2016, within the privatization program Kadıncık 1 plant together with Kadıncık 2 plant was purchased by İbrahim Çeçen Holding for  864.1 million (where $1 = 2.887 TL) in 2016.

Technical characteristics
The installed power is 2 x 35 MW. The annual energy capacity is 315 GWh. If this energy is used solely in homes; it is equivalent to the average consumption of 74,977 households. Kadıncık is the third highest energy producer in Mersin Province.

See also

 Kadıncık 2 hydroelectric power plant

References

Buildings and structures in Mersin Province
Tarsus District
Hydroelectric power stations in Turkey
Dams in Mersin Province
Dams completed in 1971
Energy infrastructure completed in 1971
1971 establishments in Turkey